David Enitan Damilola Longe-King (born 26 January 1995) is an English professional footballer who plays as a defender for National League side Dagenham & Redbridge.

Longe-King began his playing career in Non-League football with Colney Heath before later having spells with Northwood, Barton Rovers, Dunstable Town and Ware. He notably spent two spells with St Albans City and earned a call up to the England C team whilst playing for Biggleswade Town. In 2020 he moved into professional football and joined EFL League Two side Newport County before signing with Grimsby Town in June 2021.

Club career
Longe-King joined Newport County on a one-year contract on 20 August 2020 having left National League South team St Albans City at the end of the 2019–20 season. He made his professional debut for Newport in the 2-1 League Two win over Morecambe on 5 December 2020 as a second-half substitute. On 4 June 2021 it was announced that he would leave Newport County at the end of the season, following the expiry of his contract.

On 15 June 2021, Longe-King signed with Grimsby Town on a two-year deal.

On 21 January 2022, he joined Woking on loan for the remainder of the 2021–22 season, having struggled to hold a first team place at Blundell Park. On 18 April 2022 he scored his first Woking goal in a 4-1 away win against Dover athletic. Longe-king played his last match for Woking on the last game of the season on the 15 may before returning to Grimsby having made 15 appearances for Woking and scoring 1 goal.

Grimsby secured promotion with victory in the play-off final, though Longe-King was not in the matchday squad at London Stadium.

On 7 July 2022, Grimsby announced they had agreed terms with Dagenham & Redbridge over the transfer of Longe-King.

International career
Longe-King represented England C against Estonia Under 23s in June 2019.

Career statistics

Honours
Grimsby Town
National League play-off winners: 2022

Notes

References

External links

1995 births
Living people
Association football defenders
St Albans City F.C. players
Northwood F.C. players
Dunstable Town F.C. players
Ware F.C. players
Barton Rovers F.C. players
Biggleswade Town F.C. players
Newport County A.F.C. players
Grimsby Town F.C. players
Woking F.C. players
Dagenham & Redbridge F.C. players
English Football League players
National League (English football) players
Southern Football League players
English footballers